Boulenophrys brachykolos, the short-legged horned toad or Peak spadefoot toad, is a frog native to southern China and Vietnam. It was first discovered in the Victoria Peak (locally known as The Peak), Hong Kong. Many populations of Hong Kong are in the country parks, such as Lung Fu Shan Country Park.

Taxonomy and distribution
Whether Boulenophrys brachykolos is a valid species or only subspecies of Megophrys minor has been questioned, but molecular genetic evidence now supports its species status. Recent research has also shown that the species has a wider distribution than assumed before. At the time of the IUCN assessment in 2004, the species was hardly known outside Hong Kong and it was considered to be an endangered species. Reflecting the distribution now known to be much wider, the conservation status of Boulenophrys brachykolos is likely to change when the assessment is updated.

Description

Boulenophrys brachykolos are relatively small but robust frogs. They have a strongly projecting snout and a small horn-like tubercle at the edge of the upper eyelid (the "horn" of a "horned toad").

References

brachykolos
Amphibians of China
Fauna of Hong Kong
Amphibians of Vietnam
Amphibians described in 1961
Taxa named by Robert F. Inger
Endangered Fauna of China